Anna Drijver (born 1 October 1983) is a Dutch actress and model.

Biography
The Hague-born Drijver has practised classical ballet from the age of 6, and has worked as a model since she was fourteen. She appeared in the television series Goede Tijden, Slechte Tijden, had a starring role in the BNN television series Bitches and in 2005 appeared in the films Flirt and Het Schnitzelparadijs. She graduated in 2008 from de Amsterdamse Toneel en Kleinkunst Academie.

In 2008 she played a leading role in the film Bride Flight, for which she received very favorable reviews. In the same year Anna sang the role of Aphrodite (goddess of love) in the Dutch version of the video game God of War III and did voice acting for the action-MMO game The Chronicles of Spellborn.

Since 2009 she played a role in the television series De Co-assistent. In the film Komt een vrouw bij de dokter (Love Life) (based on the novel of the same name by Raymond van de Klundert), Anna played the role of Roos, the woman with whom Stijn (Barry Atsma) cheated while his wife Carmen (Carice van Houten) was battling breast cancer. That same year she played the role of Sita in telefilm Stella's oorlog. In 2010, she appeared in the mini-television series Bellicher; de Macht van meneer Miller, playing the role of Kirsten. On the big screen she played the role of Ann Marai in the Dutch remake of the Flemish Film Loft.

Drijver is also a stage actress. She starred in Buitengewoon Binnen (director: Job Raaijmakers), in Uitgedokterd  (IRPA productions, directed by Bruun Kuyt) and in 90 Minuten (directed by Ola Mafaalani ). In 2010 she starred in the show Niet zo bedoeld, direction and text by Benja Bruijning).

In 2010 Anna became an ambassador for the Ubuntu Theatre Organization. That same year, she sang Wat Doe Je Dapper with Diggy Dex. In 2011 Anna was in Wie is...de Mol?, and was eliminated in Episode 8. Later that year she was awarded de Gouden Notekraker for her roles in Levenslied and Bellicher.

Filmography

Book

Notes

External links
Anna Drijver homepage
Anna Drijver homepage, in English

1983 births
Living people
Actresses from The Hague
21st-century Dutch actresses
21st-century Dutch novelists
Dutch film actresses
Dutch stage actresses
Dutch television actresses
Dutch female models
Dutch women novelists
De Trap Theater Academy alumni
21st-century Dutch women writers